Jack Danielle Santo Tomas Animam (born November 27, 1998) is a Filipino professional basketball player for Toulouse Métropole Basket of the Ligue Féminine de Basketball. She also represents the Philippine national team.

Early life and education
A native of Malolos, Bulacan, Animam was born to Ayo Jackson Animam from Nigeria and Erlinda Santo Tomas. Her mother was an Overseas Filipino Worker.

She reluctantly took up basketball when she was in high school and was just convinced by her school's principal to join their varsity team since they lack players. Animam's hesitation to take up the sport is due to the notion that basketball is a men's sports, and women that do play the sport are lesbians.

Animam studied at the National University (NU) in Manila for her collegiate studies. She entered Shih Hsin University in Taiwan in 2020 to earn a master's degree in public relations as a student-athlete. She wanted to obtain her master's degree at NU, but the university did not offer any master's degree on business administration at that time.

College career

National University (Philippines)
Animam became skilled enough to be brought to the National University by coach Patrick Aquino while she was still in high school and was included in the NU Lady Bulldogs senior pool, since they don't have a girls' junior program. She became a key player for the NU Lady Bulldogs playing for the team for six years. The Bulldogs won six straight women's basketball UAAP titles with Animam, although Animam herself did not feature in the best of three finals of UAAP Season 82 due to an eye injury. She was also named part of the UAAP Mythical Five four times, won the Rookie of the Year in 2015, given an MVP award in 2017, and was named Finals MVP in 2018.

Shin Hsin University
In 2019, the Shih Hsin University offered her to play for their team which competes in Taiwan's University Basketball Association (UBA). Amidst the COVID-19 pandemic, she moved to Taiwan in October 2020 and made her debut for the Tigers on November 16, 2020. While playing with the Tigers in the UBA, she had to adjust having been accustomed to a more physical style of play which is more prevalent in the Philippines to lessen her chances of being given a foul. She helped her team clinch the 2020–21 season with a 18–0 win–loss record. Animam helped her team clinch the 2020–21 UBA championship, with the Tigers winning all their 18 games for that season.

Club career
After the 2020–21 UBA season Animam joined United States-based talent agency East West Private (EWP) and went to Ohio to undergo training as part of a long term bid to get into the WNBA. She then suit up for the Zone 6 Celtics in the Atlanta Entertainment Basketball League (AEBL). Animam spent three months of training under Coach Dante Harlan with EWP. She was likewised mentored and advised by fellow basketballer Imani McGee-Stafford.

Radnički Kragujevac (2021)
In August 2021, Animam joined ŽKK Radnički Kragujevac of the First Women's Basketball League of Serbia under a contract that would last until March 2022. Animam made her debut for Radnički in October 2021. She contributed 20 points in her team's 78–77 win against Proleter 023.

In December 2021, Animam sustained ACL and MCL injuries which made her unavailable for at least six months, effectively ending her 2021–22 season run. In the eight games she did play, Animam recorded an average of 20.0 points and 14.3 rebounds. She went back to the United States to undergo surgery and to recover from her injuries. She would recover and be cleared to play again on October 2022.

Toulouse Metropole Basket (2023)
Animam returned playing, joining Toulouse Metropole Basket of the Ligue Féminine de Basketball in France in January 2023.

National team career
Animam has represented the Philippines, being the youngest Filipino player at the 2015 FIBA Asia Women's Championship at age 16. She has played for her country in other international basketball competitions such as the 2016 SEABA Championship, and the 2019 Southeast Asian Games. At the 2019 Southeast Asian Games, Animam was two-time gold medalist helping clinch the women's team and women's 3x3 title for the Philippines.

Animam is also part of the national 3x3 team which competed for the Philippines at the 2018 FIBA 3x3 World Cup and the 2019 FIBA 3x3 Asia Cup.

Advocacy
Animam has been an advocate for women's basketball in the Philippines, especially after her 2018 FIBA 3x3 World Cup stint. She has urged for the establishment of a women's league in the Philippines where collegiate women basketball players could continue their career.

Awards and recognition
The Philippine Sportswriters Association conferred Animam the title of Ms. Basketball for its 2019 PSA Annual Awards Night held in early 2020. Animam is the first ever player to be given the recognition by the sports journalist organization.

References

1998 births
Living people
Competitors at the 2019 Southeast Asian Games
Filipino women's basketball players
People from Bulacan
People from Malolos
Philippines women's national basketball team players
Southeast Asian Games medalists in basketball
Southeast Asian Games gold medalists for the Philippines
Southeast Asian Games competitors for the Philippines
NU Lady Bulldogs basketball players
Filipino expatriate basketball people in Taiwan
Filipino expatriate basketball people in the United States
Shih Hsin University alumni
Filipino people of Nigerian descent
Filipino expatriate basketball people in Serbia
Southeast Asian Games medalists in 3x3 basketball